Three Peaks may refer to:

Sports and challenges

United Kingdom
 National Three Peaks Challenge, a mountain endurance challenge in Great Britain
 Three Peaks yacht race, a sailing and running race in the United Kingdom
 Yorkshire Three Peaks, the mountains of Whernside, Ingleborough, and Pen-y-ghent, visited on the Three Peaks Walk
 Three Peaks Race, a fell race over those three peaks
 Three Peaks Cyclo-Cross, an annual cyclo-cross event

Other
 Australian Three Peaks Race, a sailing and running event in Tasmania, Australia
 SCODY 3 Peaks Challenge, a one-day road cycling event in northeast Victoria, Australia
 Three Peaks Challenge, a fell run above Cape Town
 Three Peaks (film), a 2017 film

See also
 Tri Peaks (disambiguation)
 Trimountain (disambiguation)
 Tre Cime di Lavaredo, a mountain in the Auronzo Dolomites of northeastern Italy
 Five Peaks Challenge